Arrai TV was an Arabic-language television station based in Syria. The channel was owned by Misha'an al-Juburi. During the Libyan Civil War in 2011, it was used by overseas Libyans to defend the Gaddafi government, denounce the anti-Gaddafi rebels and to keep morale up of those which had fled Libya since the war. The channel aired a number of audio messages from Gaddafi and his aides when they fled Tripoli.
On 15 October 2011, Arrai TV posted a message mourning the death of Khamis Gaddafi on 29 August. 
The channel closed on 4 December 2011.

References

External links
Clip of Arrai TV news report

2011 establishments in Syria
Television channels in Syria
Arabic-language television stations
Television channels and stations established in 2011
Television channels and stations disestablished in 2011